Clara Bow (1905–1965) was a 16-year-old living in the New York City borough of Brooklyn when she won the 1921 nationwide "Fame and Fortune Contest" advertised in Motion Picture Magazine. After submitting their photographs with a completed entry form clipped from the magazine, finalists were given multiple screen tests. 
As the winner, she was cast in a small role in the silent era film Beyond the Rainbow. Although her part was eventually edited out, the contest inspired her to pursue an acting career. She relocated to Los Angeles and signed with producer B.P. Schulberg.  Her 1927 starring role in It, about an attractive and charismatic young woman, led the public to label Bow the "It girl". Over the next two decades, she would make more than 40 silent era films, the majority of them under contract to Paramount Pictures.
 
The 1927 film Wings, in which she co-starred with Charles "Buddy" Rogers, won the first Academy Award for Best Picture in 1929. Paramount initially released it as a silent film, to accommodate smaller regional theaters that were not yet equipped for sound.  They would later release a sound version, informally referred to as a "talkie".

Two of her other Paramount films, The Wild Party and The Saturday Night Kid, were also released in both silent and "talkie" formats. Paramount had a special department for the sole purpose of counting and answering every incoming fan letter. Named the film industry's top box office draw, her admirers flooded Paramount  every month with an average of 30,000 fan letters. Yet, she dreaded the transition to sound in films. Bow never lost her Brooklyn accent and speech patterns, and was convinced that the new technology would be the end of her career. The studio arranged a special public appearance for her when the "talkie" version of The Wild Party opened at the 4,200-seat Brooklyn Paramount Theater. She addressed the cheering crowd in her hometown neighborhood jargon, "I hope youse all prouda me." Both the audience and the news media gave her rave reviews for her first sound movie.

Bow never completely adapted to the process of making sound pictures, was dissatisfied with her career, and would make only nine more films. She married fellow actor (and future lieutenant governor of Nevada) Rex Bell in 1931, moving to their Walking Box Ranch that spanned part of the Mojave Desert across the Nevada and California state lines. The couple split their time between the ranch and Los Angeles, briefly operating the "It Cafe" on the corner of Hollywood and Vine. She received a star on the Hollywood Walk of Fame on February 8, 1960. During most of her husband's 1955–1962 tenure as an office holder in Nevada, Bow was confined to her Culver City, California, residence, where she was in declining health requiring around-the-clock nursing care. Rex Bell died in 1962, and Bow followed him in death in 1965.

Theatrical releases

Miscellaneous

Bibliography

References

External links
Clara Bow at the Library of Congress Silent Film Database

Actress filmographies
American filmographies